The Theatre Conservatory of Chicago College of Performing Arts is a theatre arts conservatory based in Chicago, Illinois at Roosevelt University. The school offers Bachelor of Fine Arts degrees in acting, Musical Theatre, and Musical Theatre Dance Emphasis as well as a Masters of Fine Arts in Directing offered during the summer. The conservatory currently holds classes and productions out of two theatres, the O'Malley Theatre and the Miller Studio Theatre. Both of which can be found on the Roosevelt University campus.

Past and current productions

Waiting for Lefty
An Unkindness of Ravens (2007)
Starting Here, Starting Now (2007)
God's Country (2008)
Peer Gynt (2008)
The Wild Party (2008)
Henry V (2008)
The Furies (2008)
Urinetown (2008)
Ah, Wilderness (2009)
Scapino (2009)
Bells Are Ringing (2009)
Pericles, Prince of Tyre (2009)
Bury the Dead (2009)
Jacques Brel is Alive and Well and Living in Paris (2009)
Not About Nightingales (2010)
A Flea in Her Ear (2010)
Sweet Charity (2010)
The Complete Works of William Shakespeare (Abridged) (2010)
Execution of Justice (2010)
Sweeney Todd (2010)
Eurydice (2011)
Spring Awakening- a play (2011)
Best Little Whorehouse in Texas (2011)
The Cradle Will Rock (2011)
Our Town (2011)
Rent (2011)
The Life and Times of Tulsa Lovechild (2012)
A Streetcar Named Desire (2012)
How to Succeed in Business Without Really Trying (2012)
The Tempest (2012)
Rosencrantz and Guildenstern are Dead (2012)
Lysistrata Jones (2012)
Almost Maine (2013)
The Grapes of Wrath (2013)
Spring Awakening (2013)
The Comedy of Errors (2013)
Arms and the Man (2013)
Cloud 9 (2013)
Thoroughly Modern Millie (2014)
As You Like It (2014)
You Can't Take it With You (2014)
Assassins (2014)
A Funny Thing Happened on the Way to the Forum (2015)
Picnic (2015)
The Wild Party (2015)
The Beaux Strategem (2015)
The Plough and the Stars (2015)
Henry V (2015)
Hair (2015)
The 39 Steps (2016)
Legally Blonde (2016)
The Baker's Wife' (2016)A Midsummer Night's Dream (2016)Promises, Promises (2016)Godspell (2016)Cabaret (2017)Dogfight (2017)Angels in America: Part 1 (2017)Sunday in the Park with George (2017)The Seagull (2017)The Threepenny Opera (2017)A Touch Unnatural (2017)Goodnight Desdemona, Goodmorning Juliet (2017)The Man Who Came to Dinner (2017)Summer and Smoke (2018)Heddas (2018)Urinetown (2018)Pirates of Penzance (2018)Notable alumni
 Tony Alcantar: American actor.
 Merle Dandridge:
 Television: Greenleaf, Sons of Anarchy, The Night Shift Broadway: Once on This Island (2017 Revival), Tarzan, Spamalot, Jesus Christ Superstar, Aida, Rent James Romney: 
 Broadway: Harry Potter and the Cursed Child Courtney Reed:
 Broadway: ALADDIN 
 Damon Gillespie:
 Television: Rise, Inside Amy Schumer Broadway: ALADDIN, NEWSIES Major Attaway:
 Broadway: ALADDIN J. Michael Finley: 
Film: I Can Only ImagineBroadway: Les Miserables, The Book of MormonWest End (London, UK): The Book of Mormon Angela Grovey: 
 National Tour: NEWSIES
 Parvesh Cheena: Los Angeles Actor.
 Barbara Zahora
 Shane Kenyon:
 FIlm: Jessica, Olympia Television: Chicago P.D., The Chicago Code Patrick Rooney
 Kyle Branzel

 Notable faculty 
 Joel Fink
 Ray Frewen: Associate Dean of Theatre Conservatory
 Television: Prison Break, Chicago Fire, Crime Story Off-Broadway: The Foreigner National Tour: Les Miserables Jane Lanier: Head of Musical Theatre Dance Emphasis Major
 Television: Glee
 Broadway: Sweet Charity (Revival), Jerome Robbins Broadway, Fosse: the Musical Dan Cooney: Head of Musical Theatre Major
 Television: The Americans, The Following, Elementary (TV series), Kevin Can Wait Broadway: Mamma Mia!, Bonnie and Clyde, 9 to 5, Les Misérables Off-Broadway: Heathers the Musical
 Kestutis Nakas
 Television: All My Children Kendall Kelley
 Nadine Gomes: Voice Faculty
 Rebecca Schorsch: Voice Faculty
 Michael Lasswell: Set Designer
 Steve Kruse: Master Carpenter
 Julie Mack: Resident Lighting Designer
 Daniel Drake
 Tim Stadler
 Caroline Brady Riley: Adjunct Voice Faculty
 Nancy Hess: Professor of Dance
 Film: Center Stage, Smile Broadway: Jerome Robbins Broadway, Chicago the Musical, Phantom of the Opera
 Tammy Mader: Professor of Dance
 Sarah Schafer: Professor of Dance
 Shane Kenyon: Adjunct Professor of Acting
 FIlm: Jessica, Olympia Television: Chicago P.D., The Chicago Code''
 Barbara Zahora: Professor of Acting

External links
Chicago College of Performing Arts
Chicago College of Performing Arts - The Theatre Conservatory

References

Drama schools in the United States
Roosevelt University
Universities and colleges in Chicago
Theatre in Chicago
Private universities and colleges in Illinois